"Moonlight Gambler" is a song written by Bob Hilliard and Phil Springer and performed by Frankie Laine featuring Ray Conniff and His Orchestra. It reached #3 on the U.S. pop chart and #13 on the UK Singles chart in 1957.

The single ranked #32 on Billboard's Year-End top 50 singles of 1957.

The song begins with a spoken recitation by Laine saying:

"You can gamble for matchsticks,/ You can gamble for Gold,/ The stakes may be heavy or small,/ But, if you haven't gambled for love and lost,/ Then you haven't gambled at all"/ Which is repeated when sung in the Bridge section of the song. Laine's version also features a whistler and a clip clopping sound.

Other versions
Gene Barry released a version of the song as the B-side to his 1962 single "Red Silk Stockings and Green Perfume".
Winifred Atwell released a version of the song on her 2001 compilation album, Best of Winifred Atwell.
T. Storm Hunter released a version of the song on his 2010 album, Airways Hotel.

References

1956 songs
1956 singles
Songs with lyrics by Bob Hilliard
Frankie Laine songs
Columbia Records singles